Tenomerga cinerea is a species of reticulated beetle in the family Cupedidae. It is found in North America.

References

Further reading

External links

 

Cupedidae
Articles created by Qbugbot
Beetles described in 1831